Chalk Creek is a stream in Millard County, Utah, United States.

Description
It was originally known as 3rd Creek south of Sevier River to the early travelers on the Mormon Road.

See also

 List of rivers of Utah

References

External links

Rivers of Utah
Mormon Road
Rivers of Millard County, Utah